Scythris capnofasciae is a moth of the family Scythrididae. It was described by Bengt Å. Bengtsson in 2002. It is found in Kenya and Yemen.

References

capnofasciae
Moths described in 2002